Nathan "Nate" Baker (born August 6, 1985) is a former American soccer player who played for Real Maryland Monarchs and Harrisburg City Islanders in the USL Second Division. He was formerly an assistant coach at the Navy Midshipman in the NCAA, but currently is an assistant at the University of Nebraska Omaha Men's Soccer program.

Career

College and Amateur
Baker was a four-year fixture for his college soccer team at American University, starting 62 of 77 career games and helping lead the team to the Patriot League Championship and second of the NCAA Tournament in 2004. He served as captain for two years, and also served as captain of his Olympic Development Program team.

Professional
Baker turned professional when he signed with Harrisburg City Islanders of the USL Second Division in 2007. He made his professional debut on May 5, 2007 as a substitute in a 4-3 win over the Charlotte Eagles, and went on to make over 50 appearances for the team. He went on to play for Real Maryland Monarchs in the same division until 2011 when he became a full-time coach with the Navy Midshipman. Since then, he has taken the role as coach of Achilles FC 04/05. He has major honors, such as leading the team to victory in the 2021 McLean Nations Capitol Cup.

References

1985 births
Living people
American Eagles men's soccer players
American soccer players
Penn FC players
Real Maryland F.C. players
USL Second Division players
Association football defenders